Anthidium emarginatum is a species of bee in the family Megachilidae, the leaf-cutter, carder, or mason bees.

Distribution
North America

Synonyms
Synonyms for this species include:
Megachile emarginata Say, 1824
Anthidium atrifrons Cresson, 1868
Anthidium atriventre Cresson, 1878
Anthidium saxorum Cockerell, 1904
Anthidium collectum var ultrapictum Cockerell, 1904
Anthidium titusi Cockerell, 1904
Anthidium bernardinum var aridum Cockerell, 1904
Anthidium astragali Swenk, 1914
Anthidium fresnoense Cockerell, 1925
Anthidium angulatum Cockerell, 1925
Anthidium hamatum Cockerell, 1925
Anthidium spinosum Cockerell, 1925
Anthidium lucidum Cockerell, 1925
Anthidium rhodophorum Cockerell, 1925
Anthidium sculleni Schwarz, 1930

References

External links
Images

emarginatum
Insects described in 1824